Miami-Dade Transit operates the Metrorail rapid transit system and the Metromover people mover system in Miami and Greater Miami-Dade County, Florida, United States. The network consists of two elevated Metrorail lines (Green Line and Orange Line) and three elevated Metromover lines (Brickell Loop, Inner Loop, and Omni Loop).  In the third quarter of 2019, the entire system served 86,600 passengers per weekday, with 59,000 passengers riding the Metrorail and 27,600 riding the Metromover.  Miami-Dade Transit operates 42 metro stations, with 23 in the Metrorail system throughout Miami-Dade County and 21 in the Metromover system within Downtown Miami,  Brickell, and Government Center stations serve both systems, allowing for transfers between all Metrorail and Metromover lines.

The initial  Metrorail line opened in three segments.  Service began on May 20, 1984, with the opening of the first  segment, featuring 10 stations from Dadeland South station in Kendall to Historic Overtown/Lyric Theatre station in the Overtown neighborhood of Miami. On December 17, 1984, the second segment opened, expanding service to the northwest with the opening of five new stations through Earlington Heights station.   The third segment opened on May 19, 1985, providing service past Earlington Heights station, with an additional five stations opened through Okeechobee station in Hialeah.

Since the opening of the initial line, one infill station and two extensions have been added to the Metrorail. Tri-Rail station was opened in 1989, providing a connection to the new Tri-Rail commuter rail service.  The line was extended  in 2003, with a new northern terminus at Palmetto station in Hialeah.  The  AirportLink branch and Miami International Airport (MIA) station opened in 2012, and became the second station to connect with Tri-Rail. The new branch split the Metrorail system into two lines: the existing service from Palmetto to Dadeland South was designated as the Green Line, and the new service from MIA to Dadeland South was designated as the Orange Line.

Metromover service began on April 17, 1986, with the opening of the initial  loop through the Miami Central Business District. On May 26, 1994, service expanded with the opening of the  Omni Loop and  Brickell Loop branches into the Arts & Entertainment District and Brickell districts, respectively.  Bicentennial Park station on the Omni Loop closed in 1996 due to low ridership; it was renovated and reopened in 2013 as Museum Park station. MiamiCentral station opened in 2018, serving Brightline inter-city rail service; the station connects with Metrorail and Metromover via Historic Overtown/Lyric Theatre station and Wilkie D. Ferguson Jr. station, respectively.

Metrorail stations

Metromover stations

See also 
 List of Metrobus routes (Miami-Dade County)

Notes

References 

Transportation in Miami
List of stations
 
 
Miami-Dade Transit
Miami-Dade Transit
Miami-related lists
Florida transportation-related lists
Miami-Dade